OMOV could mean:

 One man, one vote, as a pro-democracy slogan
 One member, one vote, in Commonwealth parliamentary systems
 Omo virus (OMOV), a strain of Qalyub orthonairovirus